Gavin White is an Irish Gaelic footballer who plays for the Dr Crokes club and at senior level for the Kerry county team.

Honours
Kerry
 All-Ireland Senior Football Championship (1): 2022

Individual
All Star (1): 2022

References

Year of birth missing (living people)
Living people
All Stars Awards winners (football)
Dr Crokes Gaelic footballers
Kerry inter-county Gaelic footballers